

Results by parliamentary constituency

The results of the 2015 United Kingdom general election, by parliamentary constituency were as follows:

See also
2015 United Kingdom general election in England
2015 United Kingdom general election in Northern Ireland
2015 United Kingdom general election in Scotland
2015 United Kingdom general election in Wales
Results of the 2010 United Kingdom general election
Results of the 2017 United Kingdom general election
List of political parties in the United Kingdom
List of United Kingdom by-elections (2010–present)
Opinion polling in United Kingdom constituencies (2010–15)

Notes

References

2015 United Kingdom general election
Results of United Kingdom general elections by parliamentary constituency